Plano station, also known as the Chicago, Burlington and Quincy Railroad Depot is an Amtrak intercity train station in Plano, Illinois, United States. The station was added to the U.S. National Register of Historic Places on November 12, 1993.

Currently, four Amtrak trains stop at Plano per day. These serves are the Illinois Zephyr and the Carl Sandburg. The Illinois Zephyr stops in the morning (to Chicago Union Station) and in the evening (to Quincy). The Carl Sandburg stops in the morning (to Quincy) and the evening (to Chicago). The Southwest Chief and California Zephyr pass through the station but do not stop. 

Metra is exploring extending the BNSF Railway Line to Sandwich, Illinois in the future, and originally proposed the Plano Amtrak station as one of the stops on the proposed extension. However, the proposed station location was changed to near Little Rock road in Plano's city limits, over 1 mile west of the current station.

Architecture
The rectangular Chicago, Burlington and Quincy Railroad Depot in Plano is constructed in a combination of Classical Revival and American Craftsman architectural styles.

History
The building currently being used as the Amtrak station in Plano, Illinois was constructed in 1913 by Eidelgeorge Reuter and Company of Aurora, Illinois. Amtrak service began here on April 30, 1972.

The Plano Amtrak station was added to the U.S. National Register of Historic Places on November 12, 1993 due to its association with Plano's history of rail transportation. The history of the city of Plano is tied to the railroad, the Kendall County city grew around the tracks unlike its neighbors of Yorkville, and Oswego. The Amtrak station at Plano is one of the smallest station houses in the United States.

In popular culture
The movie, "Witless Protection" was filmed in Plano, using the train station as the Police Headquarters in the movie.  The station was also featured in the 2013 Superman movie, "Man of Steel", which was filmed in Plano.  The station was used as the Village Hall for Superman's hometown of Smallville, Kansas.

See also
Chicago, Burlington and Quincy Railroad Depot
National Register of Historic Places listings in Kendall County, Illinois

References

External links

Plano Amtrak Station (USA Rail Guide -- Train Web)

Amtrak stations in Illinois
Plano, Illinois
Former Chicago, Burlington and Quincy Railroad stations
National Register of Historic Places in Kendall County, Illinois
Railway stations on the National Register of Historic Places in Illinois
Railway stations in the United States opened in 1913
Buildings and structures in Kendall County, Illinois
1913 establishments in Illinois